Callidema boussingaultii is a species of beetle in the family Cicindelidae, the only species in the genus Callidema.

References

Cicindelidae
Monotypic Adephaga genera
Beetles described in 1843